The 22nd Division was one of the divisions of the Spanish Republican Army that were organized during the Spanish Civil War on the basis of the Mixed Brigades. It came to operate on the Andalusian and Levante fronts.

History 
The unit was created on April 3, 1937, within the Army of the South. The 22nd Division was born from the militarization of the old Granada sector. The unit, made up of 51st, 78th and 93rd mixed brigades, was initially under the command of Antonio Gómez de Salazar and, later, Urbano Orad de la Torre. As of June 1937, the division was integrated into the IX Army Corps, on the Andalusian front.

In the spring of 1938 the division was sent as reinforcement to the Levante front, being added to the XXI Army Corps. The division was later assigned to the XXIII Army Corps, where it remained until the end of the war.

Controls 
 Commanders
 Antonio Gómez de Salazar;
 Urbano Orad de la Torre (from April 1937);
 Francisco Menoyo Baños (from June 1937);
 Víctor Álvarez González (from January 1938);
 Eusebio Sanz Asensio (from November 1938);

Commissar
 José Cuadras Botines, of the PCE;

 Chiefs of Staff
 Ángel Saavedra Gil; 
 Francisco Lucio Bañuelos (from January 1938);
 José Bueno Quejo (from February 1939);

Order of battle

Notes

References

Bibliography
 
  
 
 
 
 

Military units and formations established in 1937
Military units and formations disestablished in 1939
Divisions of Spain
Military units and formations of the Spanish Civil War
Military history of Spain
Armed Forces of the Second Spanish Republic